The Cyprus peace process refers to negotiations and plans aimed at resolving the Cyprus dispute. The peace efforts had begun already prior to the 1974 Turkish invasion of Cyprus, followed by ceasefire arrangements and a prolonged peace process, which has lasted for more than four decades and is yet to be finalised.

There are two major approaches to resolve the Cyprus dispute: the reunification of Cyprus into a single state and the two-state solution, which would basically legalise the current status quo where Greek Cypriots govern the southern part of the island while the Turkish Cypriots govern the northern part of the island.

See also

 List of Middle East peace proposals
 List of United Nations Security Council resolutions concerning Cyprus

External links
 UN Cyprus Talks
 JourneyMan Pictures - Unifying Cyprus: Is It Now or Never for Cypriot Unification? (2017)

References

 
Cyprus dispute